The 1885 Scottish Cup Final was the 12th final of the Scottish Cup and the final of the 1884–85 Scottish Cup, the most prestigious knockout football competition in Scotland.

The original match - which ended in a 0–0 draw - was played at the second Hampden Park in Crosshill (today part of Glasgow) on 21 February 1885 and was watched by a crowd of 3,000 spectators. The replay took place at the same venue on 28 February 1885 in front of 5,000 spectators. Renton won the competition for the first time after they beat Vale of Leven 3–1.

This was the first Scottish Cup final to be held at the second Hampden Park.

Background
Vale of Leven had reached the final on four previous occasions, winning the trophy for three consecutive seasons between 1877 and 1879. They had reached the final for the third season in succession however, they never appeared for the previous final in protest after the SFA had refused to postpone the match. Prior to 1885, no team had reached the final for three successive seasons without lifting the trophy at least once.

Renton had only previously reached the final once before 10 years earlier when they lost 3–0 to Queen's Park

As the earlier rounds of the Scottish Cup were regionalised at the time, Dunbartonshire neighbours Renton and Vale of Leven had previously met three times in the competition with Vale of Leven progressing each time.

Route to the final

Renton

Vale of Leven

Match details

Original

Replay

References

External links
London Hearts Scottish Football Reports 21 February 1885
London Hearts Scottish Football Reports 28 February 1885

Scottish Cup Finals
Scottish Cup Final 1885
Scottish Cup Final 1885
Cup
19th century in Glasgow
February 1885 sports events